Centennial Park Conservatory is a conservatory in Toronto, Ontario, Canada. It is located in Centennial Park, in the former City of Etobicoke. This conservatory is cared for by Toronto Parks who also run Allan Gardens. Admission is free.

Seasonal shows 
The highlight is the Christmas show which opens the second Sunday of December with Christmas carollers, cookies and hot apple cider. In December many different poinsettias are displayed, from white to red to dark purple. The Japanese chrysanthemum show occurs the first Sunday in November. The spring show at Easter features hyacinths, tulips, hydrangeas and Easter lilies.

Gallery

References

External links

 Official Website
 Toronto Plus: Centennial Park Conservatory
 Our Faves: Centennial Park Conservatory
 Photojack
 Wedding Photography Permits at Conservatory

Parks in Toronto
Etobicoke
Greenhouses in Canada
Botanical gardens in Canada